Brandon "Bug" Hall (born February 4, 1985) is an American actor.  He is best known for his childhood roles as Alfalfa Switzer in The Little Rascals (1994), Newt Shaw in The Big Green (1995), and Buster Stupid in The Stupids (1996).

Life and career
Brandon Hall, nicknamed "Bug" by his family, was born in Fort Worth, Texas, on February 4, 1985. He is the second oldest in his family. Most popular as a child actor during the 1990s, he is best known for portraying Our Gang kid Alfalfa in the 1994 film The Little Rascals. He and five others in the cast of The Little Rascals won a Young Artist Award for Best Performance by a Youth Ensemble in a Motion Picture. Following Rascals, Hall appeared in John Landis's The Stupids and the soccer comedy The Big Green. In 1996, Hall was nominated for a YoungStar award (Best Performance by a Young Actor in a Made For TV Movie) for his work as Eddie Munster in the Fox telefilm The Munsters' Scary Little Christmas, and he voiced a little boy in Disney's Hercules in 1997.

In 1998, he played the lead as Scout Bozell in the film Safety Patrol.  Bug Hall also starred in Disney's Honey, We Shrunk Ourselves as Adam Szalinski. Since then, he has continued to appear in films as a teenager and young adult. He was in the direct-to-DVD film Skipped Parts, released in 2000, with Mischa Barton. He also appeared in 2002 in the Disney Channel Original Movie Get a Clue, starring Lindsay Lohan and Brenda Song. Hall has had many notable TV guest appearances, appearing on Charmed, Strong Medicine, CSI: Crime Scene Investigation, Cold Case, Justice,  Providence, Criminal Minds, and 90210.

In 2013 Bug Hall converted to Catholicism and in 2020 left Hollywood. In 2021 he released a YouTube video explaining that he had moved to a farm in the Midwest with his wife and daughter and that the family were to take a vow of poverty.

Legal trouble and controversy
In June 2020, Bug Hall was arrested for inhaling an air duster which a police investigation ruled as an attempted alcohol poisoning. An outlet from TMZ stated that Hall's family were the ones who made the report and that Hall himself admitted to inhaling from cans.

In December 2022, Hall was permanently banned on Twitter for posting Tweets related the support of Marital rape as a method of Parenting and Corporal punishment of minors. He followed up on the ban through his Instagram stating: "The truth will always be unpopular. The truthful will always be persecuted. But eternity will always be sweet".

Filmography

Film

Television

References

External links
 
 

1985 births
20th-century American male actors
21st-century American male actors
American male child actors
American male film actors
American male television actors
Living people
Male actors from Fort Worth, Texas